David Peter Bergland (June 4, 1935 – June 3, 2019) was an American politician who was the United States Libertarian Party's nominee for President of the United States in the 1984 presidential election, and also served twice as the chair of the Libertarian National Committee.

Background
Bergland was born June 4, 1935, in Mapleton, Iowa, the son of Gwendolyn (née McCalman) and Cedores P. Bergland.

Political campaigns and activities
A resident of California and a lawyer, Bergland ran unsuccessfully for office several times, always as a Libertarian. In 1974, he ran as a write-in candidate for California Attorney General. In 1978, Bergland ran for the California state senate district 36, receiving 5.8% of the vote to finish third out of the three candidates on the ballot.

Bergland received the party's vice-presidential nomination in the 1976 presidential election, sharing the ticket with Roger MacBride. The MacBride/Bergland ticket received 172,553 votes (0.2%).

He served as the party's national chair from 1977 to 1981, and from 1998 to 2000.

In 1980, Bergland ran for the United States Senate, finishing third of five with 202,410 votes (2.4%).

Bergland received the Libertarian Party's presidential nomination in the 1984 presidential election. He and his running mate, Jim Lewis, received 228,111 (0.3%).

He managed the 2000 Libertarian presidential campaign of Harry Browne. Bergland endorsed the Free State Project in January 2006.

Views
In the 1980s, Bergland wrote a book entitled, Libertarianism in One Lesson.  The book explained the libertarian philosophy and touched on issues including the government as a nature of coercion, how libertarianism developed in America and how it is different from both liberalism and conservatism, the contention that taxation is theft, support of a foreign policy of non-intervention, free trade with other countries, gun rights, and criminal justice reform, opposition to drug and alcohol prohibition, public education, and Social Security.

Death
Bergland died on June 3, 2019, one day short of his 84th birthday, of prostate cancer.

References

External links
 Downloadable audio interview  with Free Talk Live
  (David Bergland)

|-

|-

|-

1935 births
2019 deaths
20th-century American male writers
20th-century American non-fiction writers
20th-century American politicians
1976 United States vice-presidential candidates
Candidates in the 1984 United States presidential election
American male non-fiction writers
American people of Norwegian descent
American political writers
California lawyers
California Libertarians
Libertarian National Committee chairs
Libertarian Party (United States) presidential nominees
Libertarian Party (United States) vice presidential nominees
Long Beach City College alumni
Non-interventionism
People from Huntington Beach, California
People from Long Beach, California
People from Mapleton, Iowa
People from Santa Cruz, California
United States Army soldiers
University of California, Los Angeles alumni
USC Gould School of Law alumni
Writers from California
20th-century American lawyers